Horsepen, West Virginia may refer to:
Horsepen, Mingo County, West Virginia, a former community
Horsepen, Virginia, which originally had a post office in West Virginia